Baskeleh-ye Garmeh (also Romanized as Bāskeleh-ye Garmeh; also known as Bāskeleh Garmeh-ye Soflá) is a village in Zarneh Rural District, Zarneh District, Eyvan County, Ilam Province, Iran. At the 2006 census, its population was 341, in 62 families. The village is populated by Kurds.

References 

Populated places in Eyvan County
Kurdish settlements in Ilam Province